The Métropole Européenne de Lille (MEL) is the métropole, an intercommunal structure, composed by a network of big cities (Lille, Roubaix, Tourcoing, Villeneuve d'Ascq, Armentières etc.) whose major city is the city of Lille. It is located in the Nord department, in the Hauts-de-France region, northern France – bordering both the Flemish and Walloon regions of Belgium. It was created in January 2015, replacing the previous Communauté urbaine de Lille, and covers that part of the Lille metropolitan area that lies in France. Its area is 671.9 km2. Its population was 1,179,050 in 2019, of which 234,475 in Lille proper. The annual budget of the métropole is €1,865 billion (2018).

History
The urban community was founded in 1967 with its first president Augustin Laurent.

Then, in 1971, Arthur Notebart, Deputy Mayor of Lomme, succeeded him until the election of Pierre Mauroy in 1989.

After the March 2008 municipal elections, each city council sent delegates to the urban community, a total of 170 voting members.

In April 2008, a new president was to be elected on a majority vote, defined at 816 votes. It caused for intense lobbying throughout the 85 cities and villages. One key issue was the investment priorities for the 2008/2014 period, namely transport, housing and the environment. The newly re-elected mayor of Lille, socialist Martine Aubry, tried to impose a new €800 million stadium in the eastern part of the community, which was opposed by three major mayors of her own party, who considered  the project as misplaced and too expensive. 

On January 1, 2015, the métropole replaced the urban community in accordance with a law of January 2014. On January 1, 2017, the number of municipalities of the métropole increased from 85 to 90. It was expanded with the 5 communes of the former Communauté de communes de la Haute Deûle on 14 March 2020.

Responsibilities

Local public transport

The metropolitan community is responsible for the co-ordination of Ilévia, the private-sector company that operates a public transport network throughout the métropole. The network comprises buses, trams and a driverless metro system, all of which are operated under the Transpole name. The Lille Metro is a VAL system (véhicule automatique léger = light automated vehicle) that opened on 16 May 1983, becoming the first automatic metro line in the world. The metro system has two lines, with a total length of 45 km and 60 stations. The tram system consists of two interurban tram lines, connecting central Lille to the nearby communities of Roubaix and Tourcoing, and has 45 stops. 68 urban bus routes cover the metropolis, 8 of which reach into Belgium.

Cross-border issues
The metropolitan community encompasses only the French part of the metropolitan area of Lille. The other part of the metropolitan area is on Belgian territory  and outside of the scope of the metropolis. The Eurometropolis Lille-Kortrijk-Tournai is a transnational structure founded on 28 January 2008 to overcome this problem. This community crosses borders and connect Lille with the nearby Belgian cities Kortrijk, Mouscron and Tournai.

Communes
Métropole Européenne de Lille consists of the following 95 communes:

Allennes-les-Marais
Annœullin
Anstaing
Armentières
Aubers
Baisieux
La Bassée
Bauvin
Beaucamps-Ligny
Bois-Grenier
Bondues
Bousbecque
Bouvines
Capinghem
Carnin
La Chapelle-d'Armentières
Chéreng
Comines
Croix
Deûlémont
Don
Emmerin
Englos
Ennetières-en-Weppes
Erquinghem-le-Sec
Erquinghem-Lys
Escobecques
Faches-Thumesnil
Forest-sur-Marque
Fournes-en-Weppes
Frelinghien
Fretin
Fromelles
Gruson
Hallennes-lez-Haubourdin
Halluin
Hantay
Haubourdin
Hem
Herlies
Houplin-Ancoisne
Houplines
Illies
Lambersart
Lannoy
Le Maisnil
Leers
Lesquin
Lezennes
Lille
Linselles
Lompret
Loos
Lys-lez-Lannoy
La Madeleine
Marcq-en-Barœul
Marquette-lez-Lille
Marquillies
Mons-en-Barœul
Mouvaux
Neuville-en-Ferrain
Noyelles-lès-Seclin
Pérenchies
Péronne-en-Mélantois
Prémesques
Provin
Quesnoy-sur-Deûle
Radinghem-en-Weppes
Ronchin
Roncq
Roubaix
Sailly-lez-Lannoy
Sainghin-en-Mélantois
Sainghin-en-Weppes
Saint-André-lez-Lille
Salomé
Santes
Seclin
Sequedin
Templemars
Toufflers
Tourcoing
Tressin
Vendeville
Verlinghem
Villeneuve-d'Ascq
Wambrechies
Warneton
Wasquehal
Wattignies
Wattrelos
Wavrin
Wervicq-Sud
Wicres
Willems

References

External links

 European Metropolis of Lille website 
 Communautés urbaines et métropoles de France 

Lille
Lille
1967 establishments in France